Glyphostoma dialitha is a species of sea snail, a marine gastropod mollusk in the family Clathurellidae.

Description

Distribution
This marine species is found along New Caledonia.

References

dialitha
Gastropods described in 1896